Johny Joseph may refer to:

 Johny Joseph (civil servant) (born 1949), Indian Administrative Service officer
 Johny Joseph (news anchor) (1964–2009), Haitian academic and journalist